West Virginian may refer to:

 West Virginia people or related
 West Virginian (Amtrak train), an Amtrak service
 West Virginian (B&O train), a Baltimore and Ohio Railroad train

See also
West Virginia (disambiguation)
Virginian (disambiguation)